Richard Crosbie (1755–1824) was the first Irishman to make a manned flight. He flew in a hydrogen air balloon from Ranelagh, on Dublin's southside to Clontarf, on Dublin's northside on 19 January 1785 at the age of 30. His aerial achievement occurred just 14 months after the first-ever manned balloon flight by the Montgolfier Brothers in France and is commemorated by a memorial located at the site of this historic event & commissioned by Dublin City Council.

Crosbie, who was six feet three inches, was from Crosbie Park, near Baltinglass, County Wicklow. He studied at Trinity College, Dublin. In December 1780, Richard married Charlotte Armstrong, daughter of Archibald Armstrong, with whom he had two children; Edward and Mary. Edward went on to become an army officer and Mary a novelist. Richard's brother, Sir Edward Crosbie, was executed for treason as a United Irishman on 5 June 1798.

Crosbie launched several balloons containing animals before attempting the first human flight on Irish soil. One of which, containing a cat, was seen passing over the west coast of Scotland, before descending near the Isle of Man. The cat and the balloon were both rescued by a passing ship. The balloonists of the eighteenth century, pioneers in the first successful method of conquest of the air, were men of science comparable to the astronauts of the 1960s, attracting the same public excitement and receiving similar international publicity.

Later life
Just 20 days or so after his famous January 1785 ascent from Ranelagh, Crosbie signed a Deed taking over the remainder of a 900 year lease from his father-in-law Archibald Armstrong, Esquire, of a property on the west side of Cumberland Street, Dublin
(which Armstrong had been leasing from one John Trotter, Gentleman, since late February 1781). The yearly rent was £30 (besides taxes) and it consisted of a house, coach house, stable and other appurtenances. Just three years later, on 19 May 1788, Crosbie (described as 'Richard Crosbie formerly of the City of Dublin, now of Ballycumber in the Kings County, Esquire') assigned the house back to Archibald Armstrong for the remainder of the 900 years. The seat of the Armstrong family was Twickenham House just north-west of Ballycumber and it is possible that Crosbie and family were residing there at the time.

The house on Cumberland Street was eventually re-assigned back to Crosbie on 1 October 1790, including "several goods and articles of household furniture". It is not known why the house changed hands so often, but it is known that Archibald Armstrong died less than three years later on 13 June 1793 and this may have had some bearing on the situation. From the record we can see that the house adjoining Crosbie's to the north was one in which Henry Luttrell, 2nd Earl of Carhampton had lately lived. At some point prior to May 1827, a fire broke out at Crosbie's home on Cumberland Street destroying a number of original deeds relating to the leases and documents concerning the house. Prior to his death in 1824, Crosbie had arranged that the house be put into the name of his daughter Mary, which came to pass in a Deed of Assignment dated 30 May 1827, with the "consent, approbation and acquiescence" of her brother Edward.

A memorial to commemorate Richard Crosbie, "The first Irishman to fly"

The statue, which was designed by leading Irish artist Rory Breslin, depicts Richard Crosbie's youthful curiosity and many of the items displayed on the bronze reflect an airborne theme. The sculpture, which is adorned with various images, gives a sense of the showmanship, extravagance and ornamentation that was evident on the actual day in January 1785. It is designed to be a fitting commemoration to Richard Crosbie and his redoubtable curiosity and determination while also being a timeless piece of art in its own right.

On 19 January 1785 at 2.30 pm, Crosbie launched, from an exhibition area at Ranelagh Gardens his Grand Air Balloon and Flying Barge in which he intended to cross the Irish Sea.

Crosbie intended to cross the Irish Sea, but as darkness fell early in the winter evenings, he decided to land at Clontarf. He attempted a channel crossing on 19 July 1785, (defying a ban on balloon flights by the Lord Mayor of Dublin because the population of the city was spending long periods gaping at the sky instead of working), but came down halfway across due to a severe storm, and was rescued by the Dun Laoghaire barge Captain Walmitt, which was following his progress.

On Sunday, 28 September 2008 in Ranelagh Gardens, in conjunction with the Ranelagh Arts Festival, Councillor Mary Freehill (deputising on behalf of the Lord Mayor) unveiled a sculpture to commemorate Richard Crosbie, "the first Irishman to fly". The statue was unveiled by Councillor Mary Freehill assisted by Frank McNally of the Irish Times and Rose Doherty (mother of world snooker star, Ken Doherty). Speaking before the launch, Cllr Freehill spoke of her delight at being asked to unveil the statue "It is truly fitting that we should honour Richard Crosbie with a statue here in Ranelagh Gardens, where Ireland's first manned balloon flight took off. I hope that residents and visitors will take time out to come and view the statue."

Dublin City Council and the Department of the Environment, Heritage & Local Government's Per Cent for Art Scheme, funded the statue.

See also
 Rev. John Crosbie

References

External links
Irish Ballooning Association
Crosbie Family History

People from County Wicklow
18th-century Irish people
Irish balloonists
Place of death missing
1755 births
1824 deaths
Richard